Leonardo Bertone (born 14 March 1994) is a Swiss footballer who currently plays as a midfielder for FC Thun.

Club career
Bertone was born in Wohlen bei Bern. He made his league debut during the 2011–12 season, his only appearance that season.

He was part of the Young Boys squad that won the 2017–18 Swiss Super League, their first league title for 32 years.

On 18 December 2018, it was announced that Bertone would join FC Cincinnati ahead of their inaugural 2019 season in Major League Soccer. On 2 March 2019, Bertone scored FC Cincinnati's first goal in the MLS.

After just one season with Cincinnati, Bertone returned to Switzerland on 13 January 2020, joining Swiss Super League side FC Thun on a two-and-a-half-year deal.

On the 16th of September 2020, he changed teams once again. Joining Jupiler Pro League team Waasland-Beveren, having signed a 3 year contract.

International career
Bertone was born in Switzerland to an Italian-German father, and Spanish-German mother. He is a youth international for Switzerland.

Honours
Young Boys
Swiss Super League: 2017–18

References

External links
 

1994 births
Living people
Swiss men's footballers
Switzerland under-21 international footballers
Swiss people of German descent
Swiss people of Italian descent
Swiss people of Spanish descent
Swiss Super League players
Major League Soccer players
Belgian Pro League players
BSC Young Boys players
FC Cincinnati players
FC Thun players
S.K. Beveren players
Expatriate footballers in Belgium
Sportspeople from the canton of Bern
Association football midfielders